Aritra Dutta (born 15 August 1991) is a Singaporean cricketer. In October 2018, he was named in Singapore's squad for the 2018 ICC World Cricket League Division Three tournament in Oman. He played in Singapore's opening fixture of the tournament, against Oman on 10 November 2018. He was the leading run-scorer for Singapore in the tournament, with 204 runs in five matches.

In September 2019, he was named in Singapore's Twenty20 International (T20I) squad for the 2019–20 Singapore Tri-Nation Series. He made his T20I debut for Singapore, against Zimbabwe, in the Singapore Tri-Nation Series on 29 September 2019. In October 2019, he was named in Singapore's squad for the 2019 ICC T20 World Cup Qualifier tournament in the United Arab Emirates.

References

External links
 

1991 births
Living people
Singaporean cricketers
Singapore Twenty20 International cricketers
Singaporean sportspeople of Indian descent